John Rooney may refer to:

John Rooney (sportscaster) (born 1954), American sports announcer
John Rooney (footballer) (born 1990), English footballer
John Rooney (squash player) (born 1979), Irish squash player
John Rooney (Irish politician), Irish Farmers's Party TD for Dublin County, 1922–1923
John Rooney (murderer) (1880–1905), convicted American murderer and last person executed by North Dakota
John E. Rooney (politician) (born 1939), American politician from New Jersey
John E. Rooney (businessman) (?–2011), U.S. Cellular CEO
John J. Rooney (politician) (1903–1975), American Democratic Party politician from New York
John J. Rooney (judge), American judge in Wyoming 
John Rooney (bishop) (1844–1927), Irish-born Roman Catholic bishop in South Africa
JP Rooney (John Paul), Gaelic footballer